Liron is a Hebrew gender-neutral given name meaning "my joy" or "my song". It is also an Albanian given name meaning "freeing" or "free". The name may refer to:

People

Given name
Liron Basis (born 1974), Israeli football player
Liron Diamant (born 1990), Israeli football player
Liron Vilner (born 1979), Israeli football player
Liron Zarko (born 1981), Israeli football player

Surname
Ludovic Liron (born 1978), French football player

Hebrew-language given names